Forming may refer to:
"Forming" (song), a song by the Germs
Forming (metalworking), a metalworking process where a workpiece is reshaped without adding or removing material
Cold forming or cold working
Roll forming

See also
Vacuum forming
Thermoforming
Form (disambiguation)
Formation (disambiguation)